9 Air Co., Ltd., operating as 9 Air, is a Chinese low-cost airline headquartered in Baiyun District, Guangzhou, China. 9 Air was created as a subsidiary of Juneyao Airlines in 2014.

9 Air is the first and only low-cost airline in Central and Southern China, with Guangzhou Baiyun International Airport as the main operating base. It successfully launched its first flight on December 2, 2014, and officially started commercial operations on January 15, 2015.

Juneyao Airlines currently owns 95.24% shares of 9 Air Co Ltd and the remainder 4.76% is owned by Ji Guangping.

History
9 Air's daily operations were initiated on 15 January 2015 for the route from Guangzhou – Wenzhou – Harbin.

On August 30, 2014, the first aircraft of 9 Air arrived in Guangzhou, a Boeing 737-8GP(WL) with tail number B-1715 leased from CMIG Aviation Leasing. The vertical tail was painted orange.

On July 15, 2016, Boeing delivered the first 9 Air-owned aircraft on the anniversary of Boeing's 100th birthday. For this Boeing 737-800, 9 Air and Boeing chose a special commemorative edition of gold tail livery.

On January 23, 2018, the 9 Air's Wi-Fi Internet service test on the Boeing 737 was successful. 9 Air becomes the first domestic airline to achieve in-flight Wi-Fi access on a narrow-body aircraft.

On October 30, 2018, the 17th new aircraft and the first B737MAX arrived in Guangzhou, tail number B-206J, and the vertical tail was painted in red.

On July 8, 2019, 9 Air launched a direct flight from Guangzhou to Sihanoukville, Cambodia, becoming the first Chinese airline operating this route. As of June 2020, 9 Air is no longer operating this route.

On March 17, 2020, 9 Air flew the first cargo charter flight between China and Myanmar, and received the Chinese Chamber of Commerce in Myanmar's request for assistance. 9 Air flew flight AQ1359 Guangzhou-Yangon flight, delivering urgently needed materials to ensure the normal operation and stability of the local Chinese business plants and overseas Chinese workers. On March 19, 2020, four rescue flights were dispatched from Shenzhen and Guangzhou, and 573 Hubei citizens who were stranded in Thailand were able to return home safely.

On March 31, 2020, 9 Air successfully obtained the cabin cargo operation qualification from CAAC.

Services

Economy 
9 Air offers all-economy seating across its fleet. The economy cabin includes extra leg room seats, the ability to buy on board meals, and non-alcoholic drinks.

Destinations
9 Air serves the following destinations:

Fleet

, 9 Air operates an all-Boeing fleet consisting of the following aircraft:

References

External links

 9Air
 9Air 

Airlines of China
Airlines established in 2014
Companies based in Guangzhou
Privately held companies of China
Chinese brands
Low-cost carriers
Chinese companies established in 2014